The Quintet for Clarinet and Strings in B-flat major, Op. 44, is a clarinet quintet by Thomas Täglichsbeck. It is scored for clarinet in Bb and string quartet, and was published in 1863.

Structure

The work is structured in four movements:

 Allegro con fuoco
 Scherzo: Allegro
 Adagio
 Rondo: Allegretto vivace

References

External links

Taglichsbeck
1863 compositions
Compositions in B-flat major